Hits and More is the second greatest hits package released by American country music singer Martina McBride. The album was released on January 16, 2012, in the United Kingdom and January 17, 2012, in the United States; it was McBride's final release under her contract with RCA Records.

Content
The album spans between 1993 and 2009, from her second album The Way That I Am to her tenth, Shine. It also includes three of the four new songs from her previous hits compilation, Greatest Hits, and unlike that album it includes songs from Martina, Waking Up Laughing and Shine.

The set also features two new songs, "Surrender" and "Straight to the Bone", as well as "Being Myself" which was previously only available on the limited edition On Target EP released at Target stores in 2004. With the exception of these three songs, all of the songs on the album are top-twenty hits on the Billboard Hot Country Songs chart, including four number ones, ten top-fives and two top-tens. The album debuted at 47 on the Billboard 200 and 11 on the Country album charts in the US while making number 1 on the UK Country Compilations Chart.

Track listing

Personnel on tracks 18-20
Joe Chemay- bass guitar
J.T. Corenflos- electric guitar
Dan Dugmore- 12-string electric guitar, steel guitar
John Hobbs- Hammond B-3 organ
Dann Huff- electric guitar
David Huff- drum programming
B. James Lowry- acoustic guitar
Martina McBride- lead vocals, background vocals
The Nashville String Machine- strings
Kevin Paige- background vocals
Jimmie Lee Sloas- bass guitar
Biff Watson- acoustic guitar
Lonnie Wilson- drums
Paul Worley- acoustic guitar

Release history

Chart performance

References

2012 greatest hits albums
Martina McBride albums
RCA Records compilation albums